Buxley is a hamlet in the Scottish Borders area of Scotland. Buxley is the home farm and estate offices of Manderston, and comprises cottages, offices, a dairy and other farm buildings, as well as an engine house and a fire station. Most of the buildings were constructed between 1897 and 1900, to designs by the architect John Kinross for the then owner of Manderston, Sir James Miller, 2nd Baronet. The Dairy Court, Dairy Tower, Engineer's House, Fire Station and Engine House, and Head Gardener's House are protected as category A listed buildings, while several other buildings are listed at category B.

See also
List of places in the Scottish Borders

References

External links

CANMORE/RCAHMS record for Manderston House, Buxley, Farm Court

Villages in the Scottish Borders
Category A listed buildings in the Scottish Borders